Mutschellen is the name of a pass in the canton of Aargau in the district of Bremgarten near the border of canton Zurich. Three municipalities, Berikon, Widen, and Rudolfstetten-Friedlisberg, meet directly atop the pass.

Location and Development
The pass Mutschellen connects the Reuss valley in the west with communities of greater Zurich in the east. Due to its very low summit of 551 meters above sea level, Mutschellen is often called the lowest pass of Europe.

Directly on the mountain there are three municipalities: Berikon, Rudolfstetten-Friedlisberg and Widen. These three villages have grown together very closely; only those who know the place are able to say where the municipality borders are. Also considered to be part of the Mutschellen region are the municipalities of Zufikon to the west and Oberwil-Lieli to the southeast.

Mutschellen is actually a glacial moraine, which emerged during an ice age. At this time the Reuss glacier and the Linth glacier went northbound as far as the river Rhine. Even today one can see the traces of these monumental glaciers. The glaciers left huge furrows behind and during their retreat left lakes like the lake of Zurich. The pressure of the two glaciers also created the Mutschellen.

Transportation

The pass is crossed by a busy road from Bremgarten to Zufikon. The road has been significantly improved over the past ten years, particularly as it winds down into Bremgarten. The pass is also crossed by the Bremgarten-Dietikon-Bahn, a metre gauge light railway that is heavily used by commuters traveling into Zurich for work.

The top of the pass features a large intersection and train station that connects to several bus routes. Connecting travelers with the route that runs along the top of the Mutschellen. The area is also a bustling commercial area with a supermarket, Migros and Denner stores, as well as smaller independent stores.

External links 

Mutschellen
Berikon
Widen
Rudolfstetten
Oberwil-Lieli
Friedlisberg

Mountain passes of Aargau
Mountain passes of Switzerland